Norman Jason Hewitt (born 11 November 1968) is a former New Zealand All Black rugby union player.

He made a public apology after a drunken incident in 1998, and thereafter became an outspoken advocate of changing drinking habits.

Hewitt participated in, and won, season one of Dancing with the Stars in 2005. He donated his winnings to literacy charity Duffy Books in Homes. He is now associated with Rangikura School, a primary school in Porirua, Wellington.

Personal 
Hewitt was born in the Hawkes Bay, where he was also raised. Of Māori descent, he affiliates to Ngāti Kahungunu and Ngāti Tūwharetoa. He is married to former world Aerobic Champion, Arlene Thomas, who teaches group fitness at Jenkins Gym in Wellington.

Making Good Men 
Hewitt was featured in the documentary  Making Good Men, which highlights the relationship between Hewitt and former schoolmate Manu Bennett.

References

External links
 

1968 births
Living people
Dancing with the Stars (New Zealand TV series) winners
New Zealand international rugby union players
New Zealand rugby union players
Māori All Blacks players
Hawke's Bay rugby union players
Southland rugby union players
Wellington rugby union players
Hurricanes (rugby union) players
Rugby union players from Hastings, New Zealand
Ngāti Tūwharetoa people
Ngāti Kahungunu people
Rugby union hookers